The Progressive Alliance of Socialists and Democrats (S&D) is the political group in the European Parliament of the Party of European Socialists (PES). The Progressive Alliance of Socialists and Democrats was officially founded as a Socialist Group on 29 June 1953 which makes it the second oldest political group in the European Parliament after Renew Europe (Renew). It adopted its present-day name on 23 June 2009. Centre-left in orientation, the group mostly comprises social-democratic parties and is affiliated with the Progressive Alliance and Socialist International.

Until the 1999 European Parliament elections, it was the largest group in the Parliament, but since then it has always been the second-largest group. During the eighth EU Parliament Assembly, the S&D was the only Parliament group with representation from all 27 EU member states. In the current EU Parliament the S&D is currently composed of 146 members from 25 member states.

In the European Council, 8 out of 27 heads of state and government belong to PES parties and in the European Commission, 8 out of 27 Commissioners come from PES parties.

History
The Socialist Group was one of the first three groups to be created when it was founded on 23 June 1953 in the Common Assembly of the European Coal and Steel Community. The Common Assembly was the predecessor of the European Parliament.  A group bureau and secretariat was established in Luxembourg. The group continued through the creation of the appointed Parliament in 1958 and, when the Parliament became an elected body in 1979 following the first European election, the group became the largest in terms of returned MEPs. It has ever since remained the largest or second-largest Group.

In 1987, the Single European Act came into force and the group began co-operating with the European People's Party (EPP) to secure the majorities needed under the cooperation procedure. The left–right coalition between the Socialists and EPP has dominated the Parliament since then and the post of President of the Parliament has alternated between the two groups ever since, with some exceptions.

Meanwhile, the national parties making up the group were also organising themselves on a European level outside the Parliament, creating the Confederation of Socialist Parties of the European Community in 1974. The Confederation was succeeded by the Party of European Socialists (PES), in 1992. As a result, the parliamentary group was renamed the Group of the Party of European Socialists on 21 April 1993.

In 1999, the Parliament refused to approve the Santer Commission's handling of the EU budget. Allegations of corruption centred on two PES Commissioners, Édith Cresson and Manuel Marín. The group initially supported the Commission but later withdrew their support, forcing the Commission to resign.
 
The group was renamed again to the Socialist Group in the European Parliament on 20 July 2004 and was given a different logo, to further distinguish the PES group organisation from the PES European political party.

In 2007, the Socialist Group was the second largest group in Parliament, with MEPs from all but two member states, Latvia and Cyprus. However, the 2009 European election saw a reduction in the number of PES MEPs returned from 2004. The group sought additional members in the Democratic Party of Italy, which was not affiliated to the PES in 2009. By the conclusion of the 2004–2009 parliamentary term, the Democratic Party had 8 MEPs in the Socialist Group (coming from the Democrats of the Left), but also had 8 MEPs in ALDE Group (coming from the Daisy). The Democratic Party is a big tent centre-left party, strongly influenced by social democracy and the Christian left, and had MEPs who were former Christian Democrats or had other political views. So a new and more inclusive group name had to be found.
  
The group was going to be named Alliance of Socialists and Democrats for Europe (ASDE) but this was seemed too similar to Alliance of Liberals and Democrats for Europe (ALDE). The name Progressive Alliance of Socialists and Democrats was suggested on 18 June by group president Martin Schulz and it was renamed on 23 June 2009. The English abbreviation was initially unclear, being variously reported as PASD, S&D Group or PASDE. Dissatisfaction by Socialist MEPs towards the new name led Martin Schulz to admit that the name was still under consideration and that the group was to be referred to as the "Socialists and Democrats" until a final title was chosen. On 14 July 2009, the first day of the constitutive session of the 2009–2014 term, the full formal group name was Group of the Progressive Alliance of Socialists and Democrats in the European Parliament and the abbreviation was S&D.

The S&D Group joined the Progressive Alliance upon its official foundation on 22 May 2013 and is a member of the organisation's board. The group was formerly an associated organisation of the Socialist International.

Presidents of the European Parliament
For presidents of the European Parliament from the group, see President of the European Parliament.

Organisation 
The group is led by a President and a Bureau of vice-presidents. There is also a Treasurer and a Secretary General.

Presidents of the group
Presidents of the group include:

2019–2024 legislature

Vice-presidents

Following the 2019 European elections, S&D Members elected their new political Bureau made up of the President Iratxe García Pérez, nine vice-presidents and the treasurer. As a consequence of Brexit, British S&D Member Claude Moraes had to resign from his position as vice-president. Marek Belka has been appointed the new vice-president.

  Pedro Marques (politician) (Portugal), 
  Elisabetta Gualmini (Italy),
  Biljana Borzan (Croatia),
  Alex Agius Saliba (Malta), 
  Gabriele Bischoff (Germany), 
  Heléne Fritzon (Sweden), 
  Mohammed Chahim (The Netherlands),
  Rovana Plumb (Romania),
  Marek Belka (Poland)

Treasurer
  Eero Heinäluoma (Finland)

2014–2019 legislature

Vice-presidents
Previous vice-presidents of the group appointed at the start of the current legislature in 2014

  Victor Boștinaru (Romania), 
  Tanja Fajon (Slovenia), 
  Isabelle Thomas (France),
  Enrique Guerrero Salom (Spain), 
  Marju Lauristin (Estonia),
  Jörg Leichtfried (Austria),
  Knut Fleckenstein (Germany),
  Maria João Rodrigues (Portugal), 
  Kathleen Van Brempt (Belgium),

Treasurer
  Péter Niedermüller (Hungary)

2009–2014 legislature

Vice-presidents

Previous vice-presidents of the group appointed at the start of the 2009 legislature:

María Badía i Cutchet (PSOE, Spain) – Communication Policy and Public Relations
Monika Beňová (Smer, Slovakia) – Europe of the Citizens
Véronique De Keyser (PS, Belgium) – Human Rights, Development and International Trade
Stephen Hughes (Labour, United Kingdom) – Economy and Social Policy
Stéphane Le Foll (PS, France) – Budget and Territorial Cohesion
Adrian Severin (PSD, Romania) – Foreign Policy and Defence
Gianluca Susta (PD, Italy) – Agriculture and Fisheries
Hannes Swoboda (SPÖ, Austria) – Parliamentary Affairs and Relations with International Organisations
Marita Ulvskog (SAP, Sweden) – Sustainable Development and Competition

2004–2009 legislature

Vice-presidents
Previous vice-presidents of the group for the 2004–2009 term were as follows:

 Harlem Désir (PS, France)
 Bárbara Dührkop Dührkop (PSOE, Spain) 
 Robert Goebbels (LSAP, Luxembourg) 
 Linda McAvan (Labour Party, UK)
 Pasqualina Napolitano (Sinistra Democratica, Italy)
 Hannes Swoboda (SPÖ, Austria)
 Kristian Vigenin (BSP, Bulgaria)
 Jan Marinus Wiersma (PvdA, Netherlands)

Treasurers
Current/previous Treasurers of the group are as follows:

 Magda Kósáné Kovács (Hungary, MSZP)

Secretaries General
Current/previous Secretaries General of the group are as follows:
 Manfred Michel (West Germany) c. 1970 – c. 1985
 Paolo Falcone (Italy) c. 1986 – 1989
 Julian Priestley (UK) 1989–1994
 Joan Prat (Spain) 1994–1999 (Deputy Sec Gen Richard Corbett UK)
 Christine Verger (France) 1999–2004
 David Harley (UK) 2004–2006
 Anna Colombo (Italy) 2006–2014
 Javier Moreno Sanchez (Spain) 2014–2019
 Michael Hoppe (Germany) 2019–2021

MEPs

9th European Parliament

From 6th to 8th European Parliament

References

External links

 Socialists & Democrats Group website

 
European Parliament party groups
Progressive Alliance
Political parties established in 1953
1953 establishments in Europe